The West Indies cricket team toured Pakistan in June 2022 to play three One Day International (ODI) matches. Originally, the matches were scheduled to be played in December 2021, but were postponed after multiple cases of COVID-19 were confirmed in the West Indies team and support staff. The ODI series formed part of the inaugural 2020–23 ICC Cricket World Cup Super League.

On 28 March 2022, the Pakistan Cricket Board (PCB) confirmed the fixtures for the tour, with Rawalpindi initially hosting all three matches. The following month, the PCB also announced that the series would be played without any COVID-19 protocols, meaning that the series was played with no bio-secure bubble. However, in May 2022, the PCB moved all the matches to Multan, due to the ongoing political crisis in the country. The start times of the matches were also moved to 4pm local time to mitigate the impact of the extreme heat. The last time that the ground hosted an ODI match was in April 2008, during Bangladesh's tour of the country.

Pakistan won the opening ODI match by five wickets with their captain Babar Azam scoring a century. Pakistan won the second match by 120 runs to win the series with a match to play. It was also the West Indies' tenth-consecutive series loss to Pakistan in ODI cricket. The third and final ODI match was temporarily suspended during Pakistan's innings due to a dust storm. Despite the interruption, Pakistan went on to win the match by 53 runs, winning the series 3–0.

Squads

The day before the first ODI, Keemo Paul was added to the West Indies' squad.

ODI series

1st ODI

2nd ODI

3rd ODI

References

External links
 Series home at ESPN Cricinfo

2022 in Pakistani cricket
2022 in West Indian cricket
International cricket competitions in 2022
West Indian cricket tours of Pakistan
Cricket events postponed due to the COVID-19 pandemic
June 2022 events in Pakistan